Tokarev (or Tokaryev) (Russian: Токарев), or Tokareva (Токарева), is a Russian surname, derived from the word "токарь" (turner). Notable people with the surname include:
 Anton Tokarev (born 1984), a Russian skater
 Boris Tokarev (athlete) (1927–2002), a Russian athlete
 Boris Tokarev (actor) (born 1947), a Russian actor
 Fedor Tokarev (1871–1968), a Russian arms designer and later Deputy of the Supreme Soviet of the USSR
 Nikolay Tokarev (born 1950), a Russian businessman
 Nikolai Tokarev (pianist) (born 1983), a Russian pianist
 Viktoriya Tokareva (born 1937), Russian writer
 Willi Tokarev (1934–2019), Russian and former expatriate Russian-American singer-songwriter

Russian-language surnames